The Former Presidents Act (known also as FPA;  note (P.L. 85-745)) is a 1958 U.S. federal law that provides several lifetime benefits to former presidents of the United States who have not been removed from office solely pursuant to Article Two of the United States Constitution.

History
Before 1958, the U.S. federal government provided no pension or other retirement benefits to former United States presidents. Andrew Carnegie offered to endow a US$25,000 (equal to $ today) annual pension for former chief executives in 1912, but congressmen questioned the propriety of such a private pension. That prompted legislation to provide benefits to former presidents.

When the Former Presidents Act took effect, there were two living former presidents: Herbert Hoover and Harry S. Truman. Dwight D. Eisenhower was the first president to fall under the act upon leaving office.

The original act provided for lifetime Secret Service protection for former presidents. In 1994, protection was reduced to ten years for presidents first taking office after 1996. This protection limitation was reversed in early 2013 by the Former Presidents Protection Act of 2012.

All living former presidents and their spouses after Dwight D. Eisenhower are now entitled to receive lifetime Secret Service protection. Their children are entitled to protection "until they become 16 years of age".

Benefits
By law, former presidents are entitled to a pension, staff, office expenses, medical care, health insurance, and Secret Service protection.

Pension
The Secretary of the Treasury pays a taxable pension to the president. The pension begins immediately after a president's departure from office. A former president's spouse may also be paid a lifetime annual pension of $20,000 if they relinquish any other statutory pension.

Transition
Transition funding for the expenses of leaving office is available for seven months. It covers office space, staff compensation, communications services, and printing and postage associated with the transition.

Staff and office
Private office staff and related funding is provided by the administrator of the General Services Administration. People employed under this subsection are selected by and responsible only to the former president for the performance of their duties. Each former president fixes basic rates of compensation for persons employed for them, not exceeding an annualized total of $150,000 for the first 30 months and $96,000 thereafter.

Medical insurance
Former presidents are entitled to medical treatment in military hospitals; they pay for this at rates set by the Office of Management and Budget. Two-term presidents may buy health insurance under the Federal Employees Health Benefits Program.

Secret Service protection
From 1965 to 1996, former presidents were entitled to lifetime Secret Service protection, for themselves, spouses, and children under 16. A 1994 statute, limited post-presidential protection to ten years for presidents inaugurated after January 1, 1997. Under this statute, Bill Clinton would still be entitled to lifetime protection, and all subsequent presidents would have been entitled to ten years of protection. On January 10, 2013, President Barack Obama signed the Former Presidents Protection Act of 2012, reinstating lifetime Secret Service protection for his predecessor George W. Bush, himself, and all subsequent presidents.

Richard Nixon relinquished his Secret Service protection in 1985, the only president to do so.

See also
Presidential Townhouse

References

External links

Presidency of the United States
United States federal government administration legislation
1958 in American law